= JAMBALOO =

- Status: Active
- Genre: Music festival
- Frequency: Annual
- Locations: Dallas-Fort Worth area, Texas
- Country: United States
- Inaugurated: February 1, 2025
- Founders: Joe Morrison, Shane Mullen
- Most recent: February 15, 2026
- Organizer: Spune Productions, Mullen and Mullen Music Project

JAMBALOO is an annual American music project and festival held in the Dallas-Fort Worth area in Texas.

== History ==
JAMBALOO was founded in 2024 by Joe Morrison and Shane Mullen in partnership with Spune Productions under the Mullen and Mullen Music Project of the Mullen and Mullen Injury Law Firm.

The first JAMBALOO festival was held in February 2025 and included shows at venues in Dallas and Fort Worth. The second festival took place from February 7 to 15, 2026. The project also includes a symposium focused on the local music community, which is held during the festival.

In 2025, JAMBALOO added two annual prizes, the JAMBALOO Venue Prize, a $20,000 award for an independent venue in the Dallas-Fort Worth area, and the JAMBALOO Music Prize, a $20,000 award for a full-length album by a Dallas-Fort Worth artist.
